Degrassi: Next Class is a Canadian teen drama television series created by Linda Schuyler, Yan Moore, Stephen Stohn, Sarah Glinski and Matt Huether. Premiering in January 2016, the series streams on Netflix internationally and is broadcast on Family Channel's teen block, F2N, in Canada. It is the fifth series set in the fictional Degrassi universe created by Schuyler and Kit Hood in 1979 and the direct sequel series to Degrassi: The Next Generation. Like its predecessors, Degrassi: Next Class follows a group of students from Degrassi Community School, a fictional school in Toronto, Ontario, and depicts some of the typical issues and challenges common to a teenager's life. The series producers' consider Next Class'''s first season to be the fifteenth of The Next Generation'', but is nonetheless listed as "season one" on Netflix.

The series was renewed for a third and fourth season to contain 10 episodes each. Filming began May 16, 2016 for both seasons. Both were released in 2017.

Series overview

Episodes

Season 1 (2016)

Season 2 (2016)

Season 3 (2017)

Season 4 (2017)

References 

 
Degrassi: Next Class